Fain-lès-Montbard (literally Fain near Montbard) is a commune in the Côte-d'Or department in eastern France.

Population

History
In Gallo-Roman times, a villa was built near an older temple, of which only traces remain.

Heritage 

 Saint-Denis church
 Château de Malaisy: it was a luxurious hotel with a restaurant, a swimming pool and a large reception room before its abandonment at the end of 2012 following its bankruptcy. In January 2021, a dead body was found in the château, just before it found a new owner in March 2021.

See also
Communes of the Côte-d'Or department

References

Communes of Côte-d'Or